The 2000 Richmond Spiders football team represented the University of Richmond during the 2000 NCAA Division I-AA football season. It was the program's 117th season and they finished as Atlantic 10 Conference (A-10) co-champions with Delaware after posting identical 7–1 conference records. The Spiders earned a berth as the #8 seed into the 16-team Division I-AA playoffs, but lost in the quarterfinals to #1 seed Montana, 20–34. Richmond was led by sixth-year head coach Jim Reid.

The Spiders' win over Arkansas State in week four was their first against a Division I-A opponent since 1985.

Schedule

Awards and honors
Second Team All-America – Eric Beatty (Associated Press, The Sports Network); Josh Spraker (Associated Press)
First Team All-Atlantic 10 – Eric Beatty, Josh Spraker
Second Team All-Atlantic 10 – Michael Millard, Mac Janney
Third Team All-Atlantic 10 – Chad Blackstock, Harold Hill, Ken Farrar, David Lewandoski, Mark Thompson, TyRonne Turner
Atlantic 10 Coach of the Year – Jim Reid

References

Richmond
Richmond Spiders football seasons
Atlantic 10 Conference football champion seasons
Richmond Spiders football